Alan Yentob (born 11 March 1947) is a BBC presenter and retired British television executive. He stepped down as Creative Director in December 2015, and was chairman of the board of trustees of the charity Kids Company from 2003 until its collapse in 2015.

Early life
Alan Yentob was born into an Iraqi Jewish family in Stepney, London. Soon after he was born, his family moved to Manchester where his father was in business with his wife's family, the Khazams.  One example of this collaboration were dealings in Haighton Holdings, published 1951, that shows involvement of his mother Flora, father Isaac and uncle Nadji Khazam. Together they were involved in the UK with various other textile manufacturers plus wholesalers such as Spencer, Turner & Boldero and Jeremiah Rotherham & Co. The families also had dealings in South Africa with their holding company Anglo-African Investments. The public companies were eventually shed and a few consolidated into Dewhurst Dent, in which Alan Yentob still owns a 10% share.

He grew up in Didsbury, a suburb of Manchester, and returned to London with his family when he was 12 to live in a flat on Park Lane. He was a boarder at the independent King's School in Ely, Cambridgeshire.  He passed his A Levels and studied at the Sorbonne in Paris and spent a year at Grenoble University.  He went on to study law at Leeds University, where he got involved in student drama. He graduated with a lower second class degree (2:2) in 1967.

Career
Yentob joined the BBC as a trainee in the BBC World Service in 1968 as its only non-Oxbridge graduate of that year. Nine months later he moved into TV to become an assistant director on arts programmes.

In 1973, he became a producer and director, working on the high-profile documentary series Omnibus, for which, in 1975, he made a film called Cracked Actor about the musician David Bowie.  In 1975, he helped initiate another BBC documentary series, Arena, of which he was to remain the editor until 1985. The series still returns for semi-regular editions .

He left Arena to become the BBC's head of Music and Arts, a position he occupied until 1987, when he was promoted to controller of BBC 2, one of the youngest channel controllers in the BBC's history.  Under Yentob's five-year stewardship BBC2 was revitalised and he introduced many innovations in programming such as The Late Show, Have I Got News for You, Absolutely Fabulous and Wallace and Gromits The Wrong Trousers.

In 1993 he was promoted to Controller of BBC 1, responsible for the output of the BBC's premier channel. He remained in the post for three years until 1996, when he was promoted again to become BBC Television's overall Director of Programmes.

This appointment was only a brief one, however, before a re-organisation of the BBC's executive committee led to the creation of a new post, filled by Yentob, of Director of Drama, Entertainment and Children's. This placed Yentob in overall supervision of the BBC's output in these three genres across all media – radio, television and Internet. He occupied this post until June 2004, when new BBC Director-General Mark Thompson re-organised the BBC's executive committee and promoted Yentob to the new post of BBC Creative Director, responsible for overseeing BBC creative output across television, radio and interactive services.

He also began to present BBC programmes. These have included a series on the life of Leonardo da Vinci and, from 2003, a new regular arts series, Imagine. One episode of Imagine has Yentob explore the World Wide Web, blogging, user-created content, and even the use of English Wikipedia, exploring people's motives and satisfaction that can be had from sharing information on such a large scale. His own blog, created during the making of the episode, was subsequently deleted and purged. In 2007, Yentob appeared as the 'host' of the satirical Imagine a Mildly Amusing Panel Show, a spoof Imagine... episode focused on the comedy panel game Never Mind the Buzzcocks.

According to The Times, Yentob's reputation was affected when it was revealed that his participation in some of the interviews for Imagine had been faked. Yentob was warned not to do this again, but otherwise not disciplined, much to the disgruntlement of some who have seen more junior staff lose their jobs for lesser misdemeanours.

In 2005, Yentob was awarded an Honorary Doctor of Letters from De Montfort University, Leicester.

On 17 March 2010, Yentob and Nigella Lawson opened the Jewish Museum London in Camden Town.

In July 2009 he was revealed to have accumulated a pension worth £6.3m, giving an annual retirement income of £216,667 for the rest of his life. This is one of the biggest pensions in the public sector. He earns £200,000 – £249,999 as a BBC contributor and presenter. He is paid a declared salary of £183,000 by the BBC, but additional income from the BBC for presenting and other roles is reputed to earn him an extra £150,000, bringing his BBC income to an estimated £330,000.

He has been on the board of trustees of the Architecture Foundation. He has been involved with several charities, including the posts of chairman and trustee of Kids Company.

Yentob resigned as the BBC's creative director on 3 December 2015 in the wake of allegations that he had sought to influence the BBC's coverage of the Kids Company scandal.

Kids Company

Yentob's role as chairman of the board of trustees for Kids Company, as well as the founder Camila Batmanghelidjh, came under close scrutiny following the collapse of the charity in early August 2015. He was accused of multiple shortcomings in oversight and financial management, and of failing to ensure that he avoided a conflict of interest with his position at the BBC. It was alleged that he intervened there in an attempt to deflect criticism of Kids Company and its founder Batmanghelidjh. Yentob vigorously defended his actions and stated in August 2015 that he was "not remotely considering" resigning over his behaviour. However, he resigned on 3 December 2015.

Interventions at the BBC

Yentob has acknowledged that he stood in the studio of the Today programme while Batmanghelidjih was being interviewed in July, later saying that he wished to hear what she had to say and was not attempting to intimidate staff. He also telephoned a senior member of staff at Newsnight, asking the programme to "delay a report critical of financial management at Kids Company", and telephoned the Radio 4 presenter Ed Stourton before a report in The World at One. The BBC Trust, under chairwoman Rona Fairhead, investigated these interventions, although senior BBC management were reported to have reassured the Trust that they did not compromise editorial independence at the BBC.

"Descent into savagery"

Yentob has acknowledged signing an email from Kids Company to the government which sought millions in further funding by suggesting certain communities in London might "descend into savagery" if Kids Company ceased its operations. The email, which was subsequently leaked to BuzzFeed News and the BBC's Newsnight programme, spoke of "looting, rioting and arson attacks on government buildings" and warned of possible sharp spikes in "starvation and modern-day slavery". It said that these concerns were "not hypothetical, but based on a deep understanding of the socio-psychological background that these children operate within". Yentob said this email "was not intended in any way as a threat."

Appearance before Select Committee

On 15 October 2015 Yentob and Batmanghelidjh made a joint appearance before a parliamentary Select Committee investigating the charity's collapse. Their performance was widely described as disastrous. In the New Statesman, the political commentator Anoosh Chakelian said they were a "duo of epically proportioned egos" who made "as little sense – and as many accusations – as possible" before the panel of MPs. In The Daily Telegraph, the parliamentary sketch writer Michael Deacon called their appearance the "single weirdest event in recent parliamentary history" and wrote of "three solid hours of bewildering excuses, recriminations and non-sequiturs".

Criticism from PACAC
The Commons Public Administration and Constitutional Affairs Committee report heavily criticised Yentob. He was described as someone who condoned excessive spending and lacked proper attention to his duties. The BBC is also accused of poor leadership for failing to take action against him when he tried to make suggestions about the BBC's reporting of Kids Company.

Personal life
Yentob is married to Philippa Walker, a television producer. He has two children.

References

External links
 
 BBC Imagine site

Alumni of the University of Leeds
English Jews
1947 births
Living people
BBC executives
BBC One controllers
BBC Two controllers
People from Stepney
English people of Iraqi-Jewish descent
Businesspeople from London
People educated at King's Ely
Grenoble Alpes University alumni